Ryan Eugene Bowen (born February 10, 1968) is an American former professional baseball pitcher. Bowen pitched all or parts of five seasons in Major League Baseball (MLB) from 1991 until 1995 for the Houston Astros and Florida Marlins.

Career
Bowen was originally drafted by the Astros in the first round of the 1986 Major League Baseball Draft. He spent the next four seasons working his way up through their farm system before making his major league debut in 1991, no-hitting the Cardinals for five innings. After pitching parts of two seasons for the Astros, he was chosen in the 3rd round of the 1992 MLB Expansion Draft by the Florida Marlins, with whom he spent the next three seasons.

After two additional seasons in the minor leagues, Bowen sat out the 1998 season before attempting a comeback in 1999 with the Sacramento Steelheads of the Western Baseball League. He retired after the season.

References

External links
, or Retrosheet
Venezuelan Winter League

1968 births
Living people
African-American baseball players
American expatriate baseball players in Canada
Asheville Tourists players
Baseball players from California
Brevard County Manatees players
Charlotte Knights players
Columbus Clippers players
Columbus Mudcats players
Edmonton Trappers players
Florida Marlins players
Houston Astros players
Major League Baseball pitchers
Navegantes del Magallanes players
American expatriate baseball players in Venezuela
New Orleans Zephyrs players
Osceola Astros players
People from Hanford, California
Sacramento Steelheads players
Taichung Agan players
Tampa Yankees players
Tucson Toros players
21st-century African-American people
20th-century African-American sportspeople